Darryl Glen Sittler (born September 18, 1950) is a Canadian former professional ice hockey player who played in the National Hockey League (NHL) from 1970 until 1985 for the Toronto Maple Leafs, the Philadelphia Flyers and the Detroit Red Wings. He was elected to the Hockey Hall of Fame in 1989, the Ontario Sports Hall of Fame in 2003 and the Canadian Walk of Fame in 2016. In 2017 Sittler was named one of the '100 Greatest NHL Players' in history.

On February 7, 1976, Sittler set an NHL record for most points by an individual in one game when he made ten points (six goals and four assists) against the Boston Bruins - a record that still stands after more than forty-five years. He also remains the most recent NHL player to score six goals in one game.

Playing career

Toronto Maple Leafs
Sittler grew up in St. Jacobs, Ontario, and played minor hockey in nearby Elmira. He was drafted out of the Junior C Elmira Sugar Kings by the London Nationals, soon renamed the London Knights, and played under coaches Turk Broda and Bep Guidolin. 

Sittler was selected eighth overall by the Maple Leafs in the 1970 NHL Amateur Draft. He was named team captain on September 10, 1975, after Dave Keon left the team to play in the World Hockey Association following a contract dispute with Leafs owner Harold Ballard.

In his first season as captain, Sittler finished the season with 41 goals and 59 assists, being the first Leaf ever to reach the 100 point mark. A few months later, he tied the playoff record for most goals in one game, with five against the Philadelphia Flyers. That summer, in the inaugural Canada Cup, he scored in overtime to win the final series for Team Canada over Czechoslovakia.

On February 7, 1976, in a game between Toronto and Boston at Maple Leaf Gardens, Sittler set an NHL record that still stands by tallying six goals and adding four assists for ten points (eclipsing Maurice Richard's record of eight, set in 1944). All his points were scored against rookie goalie Dave Reece in an 11–4 Maple Leaf victory.

In 1977–78, Sittler's 117 points ranked him third in regular-season scoring behind Guy Lafleur and Bryan Trottier, and also earned him a Second Team All-Star selection. Sittler's scoring totals remained a Leafs record until being surpassed by Doug Gilmour in 1992–93.

The 1978–79 season saw Sittler suffer some knee problems and miss ten games. It was also the year Leafs owner Ballard fired and then rehired coach Roger Neilson, a process which saw Sittler lobby on the players' behalf for Neilson's reinstatement.

Sittler's relationship with Ballard slowly deteriorated, particularly after Ballard hired Punch Imlach as general manager in July 1979. Imlach and Ballard both had strained relations with NHLPA executive director Alan Eagleson, who, as a player agent, represented more than a dozen Leafs, including Sittler and his best friend and linemate, Lanny McDonald. Imlach believed Sittler had too much influence on the team and tried to undermine his authority with the players. When Sittler and goaltender Mike Palmateer agreed to appear on the TV show Showdown, as negotiated by the NHLPA, Imlach went to court to obtain an injunction to stop them. When Imlach said he was open to offers for Sittler from other teams, Eagleson said it would cost $500,000 to get Sittler to waive the no-trade clause in his contract. So, instead of trading Sittler, Imlach sent McDonald to the woeful Colorado Rockies on December 29, 1979. In response, Sittler ripped the captain's C off his sweater, later commenting a captain had to be the go-between with players and management, and he no longer had any communication with management. Ballard would liken Sittler's actions to burning the Canadian flag.

Through the summer, Ballard insisted Sittler would not be back with the Leafs. But before the start of the 1980–81 season, Sittler and Ballard appeared at a news conference described as "all smiles and buddy-buddy" to announce that Sittler would be at training camp. He showed up with the C back on his sweater, reassuming the role of team captain. Sittler had arranged the talks with Ballard on his own. The discussions took place with Imlach hospitalized following his second heart attack. At the news conference, Ballard said the real battle had been between Imlach and Eagleson, and Sittler just got caught in the crossfire.

During the 1981–82 season, Ballard considered Imlach's health to be too poor for him to continue as general manager. But even with Imlach gone, Sittler's relationship with the Leafs worsened to the point where he told Ballard and acting general manager Gerry McNamara at the end of November he would waive his no-trade clause if he was sent to the Flyers or the Minnesota North Stars. In the first week of December, Eagleson agreed to terms with Flyers' owner Ed Snider and North Stars' general manager Lou Nanne. But it took another seven weeks for the Leafs to make a deal. During that time, Sittler added the Islanders and Buffalo Sabres to the list of teams he could be traded to. On January 5, 1982, on advice from his physician, Sittler walked out on the Leafs, saying he was "mentally depressed" because a trade was taking so long to complete.

Philadelphia Flyers and Detroit Red Wings

Finally, on January 20, 1982, the 31-year-old Sittler was traded to the Flyers for Rich Costello plus the Hartford Whalers' second-round pick in the 1982 draft (used by the Leafs to select Peter Ihnačák), and future considerations, which ended up being Ken Strong. Only Ihnačák would play regularly for the Leafs. In 1980, Imlach had rejected an offer from Philadelphia, who were said to be willing to trade Rick MacLeish and André Dupont for Sittler.

With the Flyers in 1982–83, Sittler earned his fourth All-Star game appearance. He returned to the Flyers the following season. Before the 1984–85 season, Sittler was told he would be named the Flyers' team captain. On the day the announcement was to be made—Sittler even had a brief speech prepared—he was instead told by Flyers' newly appointed general manager Bobby Clarke he had been traded to the Detroit Red Wings for Murray Craven and Joe Paterson. It was this incident that Sittler described as the biggest disappointment of his life. "Clarke can't come close to realizing how much he hurt me, and my family, that day," he wrote in his 1991 autobiography. Sittler contemplated retirement and did not report to the Wings for a few days, but then joined the team. He had an unproductive season, struggling to get ice time under coach Nick Polano, and finishing the year with the worst goals-per-game average of his NHL career. The Red Wings bought out Sittler's contract after the end of the season. He received a one-year contract offer from the Vancouver Canucks, but decided to retire.

After retirement from playing

Sittler was elected to the Hockey Hall of Fame in 1989. In 1991, a year after Ballard died, he rejoined the Maple Leafs organization as a consultant under general manager Cliff Fletcher, also performing public relations duties for the team on an ongoing basis. In 1998, he was ranked number 93 on [[List of 100 greatest hockey players by The Hockey News|The Hockey News''' list of the 100 Greatest Hockey Players]]. On February 8, 2003, the Leafs honoured Sittler by adding a banner with his number 27 to those already hanging in the Air Canada Centre for other Leafs greats. In a ceremony, Sittler, with his three grown children at his side, paid tribute to his wife Wendy, who had died of cancer the previous year.

In 2004, Sittler appeared as himself in a brief cameo in season two, episode two of the Canadian sitcom, Corner Gas''. The episode centred around the disputed ownership of one of Sittler's rookie cards.

Vancouver songwriters Dan Swinimer and Jeff Johnson wrote a country song commemorating Sittler's 60th birthday called "The Darryl Sittler Song". 

Sittler travels across Canada doing public speaking, autograph signings and appearances for various companies, charities and organizations. Sittler also serves as a director to a number of mineral exploration companies, including Wallbridge Mining.

Sittler was inducted into Canada's Walk of Fame on August 23, 2016. On October 15, 2016, number 27 worn by Sittler and Frank Mahovlich was officially retired by the Toronto Maple Leafs, along with the numbers of 16 other players, to celebrate the team's 100th season.

Personal life
He is the older brother of Gary Sittler who played five games in the World Hockey Association during the 1974–75 WHA season.

His son, Ryan Sittler, was drafted by the Philadelphia Flyers in the first round of the 1992 NHL Entry Draft, played hockey at the University of Michigan, and represented the United States at the World Junior Championships on three occasions.

His daughter Meaghan Sittler played four seasons at Colby College and on the United States national women's hockey team.

In July 1980, Sittler presented Terry Fox with his NHL All-Star Game jersey in Nathan Phillips Square in front of a crowd of over 10,000 supporters. Fox had said Sittler was one of his favourite athletes.

Career statistics

Regular season and playoffs

International

See also
 List of NHL statistical leaders
 List of NHL players with 1000 games played
 List of NHL players with 1000 points
 List of players with 5 or more goals in an NHL game

References

External links

 
 

1950 births
Living people
Canadian ice hockey centres
Detroit Red Wings players
Hockey Hall of Fame inductees
Ice hockey people from Ontario
London Knights players
London Nationals players
National Hockey League All-Stars
National Hockey League first-round draft picks
People from Woolwich, Ontario
Philadelphia Flyers players
Toronto Maple Leafs draft picks
Toronto Maple Leafs players